Pan, the Greek deity, is often portrayed in cinema, literature, music, and stage productions, as a symbolic or cultural reference.

Film
Playful Pan, Silly Symponies cartoon from 1930
Picnic on the Grass (1959) by Jean Renoir evokes Pan with a flute-playing goatherd.
In 7 Faces of Dr. Lao (1964), Pan appears as one of the attractions in the circus. He seduces Angela Benedict, the librarian, with his enticing music and even takes the form of the man she secretly admires, Ed Cunningham, the newspaper editor. Pan is one of the seven characters in the film played by Tony Randall.
Legend (1985) by Ridley Scott has Tim Curry playing Pan, as the character Darkness, after Scott saw him perform in Rocky Horror Picture Show.
Pan's Labyrinth (2006) by Guillermo del Toro (Spanish title: El Laberinto del Fauno) features a faun that is not Pan, but the design was based on Pan
His Majesty Minor (2007) by Jean-Jacques Annaud is a French film featuring Pan as a main character

Literature

"Pan" (1881), a double-villanelle by Oscar Wilde
The Great God Pan (1890) by Arthur Machen
Pan and the Young Shepherd (1898) by Maurice Hewlett
The Moon-Slave (1901) by Barry Pain
The Plea of Pan by Henry W. Nevinson
The Horned Shepherd (1904) by Edgar Jepson
"The Man Who Went Too Far" (1904) by E. F. Benson
The Garden God (1906) by Forrest Reid
"The Piper At The Gates Of Dawn" (1908) in The Wind in the Willows by Kenneth Grahame
Pan-Worship and Other Poems (1908)  by Eleanor Farjeon
The Devil and the Crusader (1909), horror novel by Alice and Claude Askew
The Triumph of Pan (1910) by Victor Neuberg
"The Music on the Hill" (1911) by Hector Hugh Munro aka Saki  
"The Story of a Panic" (1911) by E. M. Forster  
"The Touch of Pan" (1917) by Algernon Blackwood
Pan and the Twins (1922)  by Eden Phillpotts
The Oldest God (1926) satirical novel by Stephen McKenna
"How Pan Came to Little Ingleton" (1926) by Margery Lawrence
The Blessing of Pan (1927), a fantasy novel by Lord Dunsany
The Crock of Gold (1928) by James Stephens
The Pan trilogy by Jean Giono
Colline (1929)
Lovers Are Never Losers (1929)
Second Harvest (1930)
"The People of Pan" (1929) by Henry S. Whitehead  
The Goat-Foot God (1936) by Dion Fortune
The Call of Wings by Agatha Christie
In the short story "The Magic Barrel" by Bernard Malamud, main character Pinye Salzman is compared to Pan
"A Musical Instrument" and "The Dead Pan", poems by Elizabeth Barrett Browning
Gravity's Rainbow (1973) by Thomas Pynchon
Pan appears in The Circus of Dr. Lao (1935), written by Charles G. Finney and illustrated by Boris Artzybasheff, and its movie adaptation, 7 Faces of Dr. Lao(1964)
Pan is the primary, metaphorical theme in Knut Hamsun's novel Pan (1894)
In Jitterbug Perfume (1985) by Tom Robbins, Pan plays a prominent role throughout the whole plot
"News For The Delphic Oracle", a poem by William Butler Yeats, published in the collection Last Poems (1939)
"Pan With Us" is a poem by Robert Frost, published as Poem 26 from A Boy's Will.
Pan appears in Greenmantle (1988) by Charles de Lint 
Pan appears in Cloven Hooves (1991) by Megan Lindholm aka Robin Hobb
George Pérez's first Wonder Woman story shows a duplicitous Pan tricking Princess Diana
In "in Just=", E. E. Cummings' poem, Pan is described, metaphorically, as "the/ goat-footed/ baloonMan" 
In Peter Pan, or The Boy Who Wouldn't Grow Up by J. M. Barrie and related works, the titular character Peter Pan is based on Pan.
"The Lawnmower Man" (May 1975) by Stephen King
The Great God Pan (2003) by Donna Jo Napoli, Pan is involved in the Trojan War
In the 2005–2009 book series Percy Jackson & the Olympians by Rick Riordan, Pan is a character sought out by all the satyrs for their quests. One of the main characters, Grover Underwood, was a satyr who searched for Pan until he found him dying in the Labyrinth of King Minos.
In Rob Thurman's (2006) Cal Leandros series, Robin Goodfellow is introduced in the first book and becomes a close friend to the Leandros brothers.  He is a trickster, used car salesmen and one of the last known Puck's in existence.  He has also been known throughout history as Pan.

Music
(Alphabetical by artist)
Animal Collective has a song entitled "I See You Pan" on their release Hollinndagain.
 The medieval folk band Faun has been greatly inspired by Pan, and many of their songs are about Pan, such as "Arcadia" and "Hymn to Pan".
"Great God Pan" is a track by SD Laika from his debut album That's Harakiri.
In the original programme for Gustav Mahler's Third Symphony, the first movement is subtitled "Pan Awakes, Summer Marches In".
"La Flute de Pan" (Pan et les Bergers, Pan et l'oiseaux, Pan et les Nymphes) were composed by Jules Mouquet
Carl Nielsen composed "Pan and Syrinx".
Justinus Primitive produced the Pan-inspired album Praise Pan, Great God Pan, and the songs "On Becoming Water", "Praise Pan, Great God Pan", and "Transformation Mantra"
In "Joueur de flute" by Albert Roussel, one of the four movements is named after Pan
"Dryades et Pan" is the last of three Myths for violin and piano, Op. 30, by Karol Szymanowski.
 We Are All Pan's People is  an album by The Focus Group.
"Pan" is a song by The Veils
"The Pan Within" and "The Return of Pan" are two songs by The Waterboys.
 Pan is referenced in Stevie Wonder's song "Flower Power", from his album The Secret Life of Plants.
Pan's People, a British dance troupe from Top of the Pops, was named after Pan
The title of the 1967 Pink Floyd album The Piper at the Gates of Dawn is a reference to a chapter in the 1908 book The Wind in the Willows which features Pan

- The Waterboys have a song "The Return of Pan"on their 1993 album Dream Harder.

Plays
 Pan's Anniversary, a masque by Ben Jonson, originally performed in 1620 or 1621.

Video games
Pan appears in Castlevania: Lords of Shadow as advisor to main character Gabriel Belmont.
Pan appears as a Greek god in Dungeons & Dragons.
Pan is a high-level antagonist in the computer game Freedom Force. He plays a Pan flute that hypnotizes player characters into attacking their allies.
Pan appears in King's Quest IV: The Perils of Rosella as a satyr playing a magical flute with hypnotic abilities.
Pan has a supporting role in the game Rise of the Argonauts on PC, PlayStation 3 and Xbox 360.

Other
 Pan is worshiped by Merle Highchurch, one of the main characters in the Dungeons & Dragons comedy podcast The Adventure Zone. Pan speaks to Merle on several occasions during the story.
Pan is dead (still life), a 1911 painting by George Washington Lambert
Pan is a villain in the third season of the Netflix series Chilling Adventures of Sabrina. His gaze causes the witch Agatha to go insane.

Notes

Classical mythology in popular culture
Pan (god)
Fauns in popular culture
Greek and Roman deities in fiction